Pierre Bayle (18 November 1647 – 28 December 1706) was a French philosopher, author, and lexicographer.  A Huguenot, Bayle fled to the Dutch Republic in 1681 because of religious persecution in France.  He is best known for his Historical and Critical Dictionary, whose publication began in 1697.  Bayle was a notable advocate of religious toleration, and his skeptical philosophy had a significant influence on the subsequent growth and development of the European Age of Enlightenment. Bayle is commonly regarded as a forerunner of the Encyclopédistes of the mid-18th century.

Biography
Bayle was born at Carla-le-Comte (later renamed Carla-Bayle in his honour), near Pamiers, Ariège, France. He was educated by his father, a Calvinist minister, and at an academy at Puylaurens. In 1669, he entered a Jesuit college at Toulouse and became a Roman Catholic a month later. After seventeen months, he returned to Calvinism and fled to Geneva, where he learned about the teachings of René Descartes. He returned to France and went to Paris, where for some years he worked under the name of Bèle as a tutor for various families. In 1675, he was appointed to the chair of philosophy at the Protestant Academy of Sedan. In 1681, the university at Sedan was suppressed by the government in action against Protestants.

Just before that event, Bayle had fled to the Dutch Republic, where he almost immediately was appointed professor of philosophy and history at the École Illustre in Rotterdam. He taught for many years but became embroiled in a long, internal quarrel in the college that resulted in Bayle being deprived of his chair in 1693.

Bayle remained in Rotterdam until his death on 28 December 1706. He was buried in Rotterdam in the "Walloon church", where Pierre Jurieu would also be buried seven years later. After the demolition of this church in 1922, the graves were relocated to the Crooswijk General Cemetery in Rotterdam. A memorial stone shows that Pierre Bayle is in these graves.

Writings
At Rotterdam, Bayle published his famous  in 1682, as well as his critique of Louis Maimbourg's work on the history of Calvinism. The reputation achieved by this critique stirred the envy of Pierre Jurieu, Bayle's Calvinist colleague of both Sedan and Rotterdam, who had written a book on the same subject.

Between 1684 and 1687, Bayle published his Nouvelles de la république des lettres, a journal of literary criticism. In 1686, Bayle published the first two volumes of Philosophical Commentary, an early plea for toleration in religious matters. This was followed by volumes three and four in 1687 and 1688.

In 1690 there appeared a work entitled Avis important aux refugiés, which Jurieu attributed to Bayle, whom he attacked with great animosity. After losing his chair, Bayle engaged in the preparation of his massive Dictionnaire Historique et Critique (Historical and Critical Dictionary), which effectively constituted one of the first encyclopaedias (before the term had come into wide circulation) of ideas and their originators. In the Dictionary, Bayle expressed his view that much that was considered to be "truth" was actually just opinion, and that gullibility and stubbornness were prevalent. The Dictionary would remain an important scholarly work for several generations after its publication.

The remaining years of Bayle's life were devoted to miscellaneous writings; in many cases, he was responding to criticisms made of his Dictionary.

Voltaire, in the prelude to his Poème sur le désastre de Lisbonne, calls Bayle "le plus grand dialecticien qui ait jamais écrit": the greatest dialectician to have ever written.

The Nouvelles de la république des lettres was the first thorough-going attempt to popularise literature, and it was eminently successful. His multi-volume Historical and Critical Dictionary constitutes Bayle's masterpiece. The English translation of The Dictionary, by Bayle's fellow Huguenot exile Pierre des Maizeaux, was identified by American President Thomas Jefferson to be among the one hundred foundational texts to form the first collection of the Library of Congress.

Views on toleration
Bayle advanced arguments for religious toleration in his Dictionnaire historique et critique and Commentaire Philosophique. Bayle rejected the use of scripture to justify coercion and violence: "One must transcribe almost the whole New Testament to collect all the Proofs it affords us of that Gentleness and Long-suffering, which constitute the distinguishing and essential Character of the Gospel." He did not regard toleration as a danger to the state; on the contrary: 
"If the Multiplicity of Religions prejudices the State, it proceeds from their not bearing with one another but on the contrary endeavouring each to crush and destroy the other by methods of Persecution. In a word, all the Mischief arises not from Toleration, but from the want of it."

Skepticism
Richard Popkin has advanced the view that Pierre Bayle was a skeptic who used the Historical and Critical Dictionary to criticise all prior known theories and philosophies. In Bayle's view, humans were inherently incapable of achieving true knowledge. Because of the limitations of human reason, men should adhere instead to their conscience alone. Bayle was critical of many influential rationalists, such as René Descartes, Thomas Hobbes, Baruch Spinoza, Nicolas Malebranche and Gottfried Wilhelm Leibniz, as well as empiricists such as John Locke and Isaac Newton. Popkin quotes the following passage as an example of Bayle's skeptical viewpoint:
It [reason] is a guide that leads one astray; and philosophy can be compared to some powders that are so corrosive that, after they have eaten away the infected flesh of a wound, they then devour the living flesh, rot the bones, and penetrate to the very marrow. Philosophy at first refutes errors. But if it is not stopped at this point, it goes on to attack truths. And when it is left on its own, it goes so far that it no longer knows where it is and can find no stopping place.

Legacy and honors
In 1906 a statue in his honor was erected at Pamiers, la reparation d'un long oubli ("the reparation of a long neglect").
In 1959 a street was named after him in Rotterdam.
In 2012 a bench (By Paul Cox) in tribute to Bayle, to reflect on the (hypothetical) philosophical exchange of thought between Bayle and Erasmus. (concept of thought: JW van den Blink)

Selected works
 Pensées Diverses sur l'Occasion de la Comète, (1682) translated as Various Thoughts on the Occasion of a Comet (2000) by Robert C. Bartlett, SUNY Press.
 Dictionnaire Historique et Critique (1695–1697; 1702, enlarged; best that of P. des Maizeaux, 4 vols., 1740)
 Œuvres diverses, 5 vols., The Hague, 1727–31; anastatic reprint: Hildesheim: Georg Olms, 1964–68.
 Selections in English: Pierre Bayle (Richard H. Popkin transl.), Historical and Critical Dictionary – Selections, Indianapolis: Hackett, 1991. .

See also
 Elisabeth Labrousse

References

Citations

Sources

Further reading
 Sally Jenkinson, (dir.), Bayle: Political Writings, Cambridge UK: Cambridge University Press, 2000.
 Sally Jenkinson, Reflections on Pierre Bayle and Elizabeth Labrousse, and their Huguenot critique of intolerance, Proc. Huguenot Soc., 27: 325–334, 2000.
 Elisabeth Labrousse, Pierre Bayle, La Haye: Martinus Nijhoff, 1963–4 (2 volumes). 
 Elisabeth Labrousse, Bayle, translated by Denys Potts, Oxford: Oxford University Press, 1983.
 Thomas M. Lennon, Reading Bayle, Toronto: University of Toronto Press, 1999.
 Todd Ryan, Pierre Bayle's Cartesian Metaphysics: Rediscovering Early Modern Philosophy, New York: Routledge, 2009.

External links

 
 
 See Dictionnaire Historique et Critique for links to digital facsimiles of that work
The New Schaff-Herzog Encyclopedia of Religious Knowledge
Contains the exchanges between Bayle and Leibniz, slightly modified for easier reading
 The Correspondence of Pierre Bayle  in EMLO

1647 births
1706 deaths
17th-century Calvinist and Reformed Christians
17th-century Dutch philosophers
17th-century Dutch historians
17th-century French male writers
17th-century French philosophers
17th-century French historians
17th-century lexicographers
17th-century non-fiction writers
17th-century Roman Catholics
18th-century Calvinist and Reformed Christians
18th-century Dutch philosophers
18th-century Dutch writers
18th-century essayists
18th-century lexicographers
18th-century non-fiction writers
Age of Enlightenment
Alumni of Jesuit schools
Calvinist and Reformed philosophers
Catholic philosophers
Christian philosophers
Converts to Roman Catholicism from Calvinism
Converts to Calvinism from Roman Catholicism
Dutch essayists
18th-century Dutch historians
Dutch literary critics
Dutch non-fiction writers
Dutch philosophers
Dutch Protestants
Dutch Roman Catholics
Dutch encyclopedists
Enlightenment philosophers
Epistemologists
Former Protestants
French emigrants to the Dutch Republic
French essayists
French literary critics
French male non-fiction writers
French philosophers
French Roman Catholics
Huguenots
Literacy and society theorists
People from Ariège (department)
Philosophers of culture
Philosophers of education
Philosophers of religion
Philosophers of social science
Philosophy academics
Philosophy and thought in the Dutch Republic
Philosophy writers
Political philosophers
Social philosophers
Writers about activism and social change
Writers from Rotterdam